Stefan Kleineheismann (born 8 February 1988) is a German retired footballer.

In 2020 an injury forced him into retirement and he became an assistant coach of Greuther Fürth, while in October 2022 he was interim coach for one game.

References

External links

1988 births
Living people
German footballers
SpVgg Greuther Fürth II players
SpVgg Greuther Fürth players
Kickers Offenbach players
FC Rot-Weiß Erfurt players
Hallescher FC players
1. FC Schweinfurt 05 players
3. Liga players
Regionalliga players
Oberliga (football) players
Association football defenders
Sportspeople from Fürth
Footballers from Bavaria
SpVgg Greuther Fürth managers
2. Bundesliga managers
21st-century German people